Brachyseps is a genus of skinks. They are all endemic to Madagascar. Some taxonomic authorities place the group in the genus Amphiglossus.

Species
The following 8 species, listed alphabetically by specific name, are recognized as being valid:
Brachyseps anosyensis Raxworthy & Nussbaum, 1993
Brachyseps frontoparietalis (Boulenger, 1889) – Boulenger's tree skink
Brachyseps gastrostictus  (O'Shaughnessy, 1879) – O'Shaughnessy's Madagascar skink
Brachyseps macrocercus (Günther, 1882) – black-striped skink
Brachyseps mandady Andreone & Greer, 2002 
Brachyseps punctatus Raxworthy & Nussbaum, 1993 
Brachyseps spilostichus Andreone & Greer, 2002 
Brachyseps splendidus (Grandidier, 1872) – splendid skink

Nota bene: A binomial authority in parentheses indicates that the species was originally described in a genus other than Brachyseps.

References

Lizard genera
Brachyseps